Dongseong of Baekje (?–501, r. 479–501) was the 24th king of Baekje, one of the Three Kingdoms of Korea.

Background
He was the son of Buyeo Gonji, the younger brother of the 22nd king Munju who returned to Baekje from Yamato Japan in 477 after hearing of the fall of the Baekje capital.  Gonji died in that year, and like Munju may have been murdered by Hae Gu.  Dongseong appears to have been promoted to the throne by the Jin clan that prevailed over Hae Gu's rebellion.  After Samgeun died without children, the throne passed to Dongseong.

Reign
He worked to strengthen the court's power after the move of the capital from the present-day Seoul area to Ungjin. He built several fortresses and castles to build out the new capital. He incorporated the local Sa, Yeon, and Baek clans into the court to counter the entrenched aristocracy from the former capital.

Dongseong sent a tribute mission to the Southern Qi in 484, reopening Baekje’s ties with southern China after a long hiatus.

He established an alliance with Silla through his marriage of a Silla noblewoman in 493, and the two countries united in attacking Goguryeo in 495.

In 498, the Baekje army subjugated Tamna, the kingdom on Jeju island which had formally accepted Baekje rule twenty-two years before, because it failed to send tributes.

The Book of Qi states that Dongseong sent armies to Liaodong and Liaoxi (요서 遼西) in China to defeat Goguryeo forces.

Death
Beginning in 499, the country was stricken by famine, but according to the Samguk Sagi the king was unresponsive.  He continued to live an indulgent lifestyle while brigandage spread.

By the end of Dongseong's rule, the local clans of the new capital had eclipsed the traditionally powerful Hae and Jin clans, and even pressured the throne. Dongseong sought to contain them by exiling Baek Ga to an outlying castle. This caused great resentment, and Baek Ga's forces assassinated Dongseong while he was hunting.

Family
 Father: Buyeo Gonji (son of the 21st King, Gaero of Baekje)
 Mother: unknown
 Queen: unknown
 Son: Buyeo Sama/Buyeo Yung (扶餘斯摩/扶餘隆, 462–523) – 25th King of Baekje, Muryeong of Baekje
 Concubine: unknown – from the Jin clan
 Concubine: unknown – from Lee clan of Silla (伊飡 比智女를), married 493
 Daughter: Princess Bogwa (보과공주, 宝果公主) – consort of the 23rd King of Silla, Beopheung of Silla.

Popular culture
 Portrayed by Jung Chan in the 2013 MBC TV series The King's Daughter, Soo Baek-hyang.

See also
History of Korea
List of Monarchs of Korea

References
  Content in this article was copied from Samguk Sagi Scroll 23 at the Shoki Wiki, which is licensed under the Creative Commons Attribution-Share Alike 3.0 (Unported) (CC-BY-SA 3.0) license.

501 deaths
Baekje rulers
Korean people of Japanese descent
5th-century monarchs in Asia
Year of birth unknown
5th-century Korean people
6th-century Korean people